Jerome Van Sistine (August 16, 1926 – January 20, 2015) was an American politician.

Biography
Van Sistine was born on August 16, 1926, in Milwaukee, Wisconsin. He graduated from West De Pere High School in De Pere, Wisconsin, as well as what is now the University of Wisconsin–Platteville. He was a school teacher and was in the building construction business. During World War II, Van Sistine was in the United States Navy. He was married with three children. He died on January 20, 2015, after a long period with Alzheimer's disease.

Political career
Van Sistine was first elected to the Wisconsin State Senate in 1976, as a Democrat, representing the 30th district. Additionally, he was a member of the town board in Ashwaubenon, Wisconsin, and the board of supervisors in Brown County, Wisconsin. In 1990, he was a candidate for the United States House of Representatives from Wisconsin's 8th congressional district. He lost to the incumbent, Toby Roth,. Van Sistine was defeated for re-election in 1992 by Gary Drzewiecki.

References

Politicians from Milwaukee
People from Ashwaubenon, Wisconsin
Wisconsin city council members
County supervisors in Wisconsin
Democratic Party Wisconsin state senators
Military personnel from Wisconsin
United States Navy sailors
United States Navy personnel of World War II
University of Wisconsin–Platteville alumni
1926 births
2015 deaths